Osieczna  is a town in Leszno County, Greater Poland Voivodeship, Poland, with 2,106 inhabitants (2007). It is located on the northern shore of the Łoniewskie Lake.

History

As part of the region of Greater Poland, i.e. the cradle of the Polish state, the area formed part of Poland since its establishment in the 10th century. It was a private town, administratively located in the Kościan County in the Poznań Voivodeship in the Greater Poland Province of the Kingdom of Poland. In the Second Partition of Poland, in 1793, it was annexed by Prussia. Following the successful Greater Poland uprising of 1806, it was included within the short-lived Polish Duchy of Warsaw. After the duchy's dissolution in 1815, it was reannexed by Prussia, and from 1871 it was also part of Germany. The populace was subjected to Germanisation policies.

On January 11, 1919, Osieczna was the site of a victorious battle of the Polish insurgents against the Germans during the Greater Poland uprising, and it was soon reintegrated with Poland, which just regained independence.

During the German occupation of Poland (World War II), on October 21, 1939, the Germans carried out a public execution of a group of local Poles (see Nazi crimes against the Polish nation). It was one of many massacres of Poles committed by Germany on October 20–23 across the region in attempt to pacify and terrorize the Polish population.

Sights
Osieczna Castle
Gothic-Baroque Holy Trinity church
Baroque Reformati monastery and Saint Valentine church
Old post mills
Rynek (Market Square) filled with historic townhouses
Monument to the Battle of Osieczna of 1919

References

Cities and towns in Greater Poland Voivodeship
Leszno County
Populated lakeshore places in Poland